The Port of Mariupol or Mariupol Sea Port is located in Mariupol, Ukraine in the Taganrog Bay, Sea of Azov. The port is governed by the port authority managed by Ukrainian Sea Ports Authority. As of June 2022, it is occupied by Russian armed forces.

The berthing line of the seaport is 3.9 km (22 berths), with depths down to 9.75 meters. The port is served by one port railway station "Mariupol-Port." The total length of the railways of the port is 27,1 km. Highways are adjacent to the port. 

The cargo turnover of Mariupol seaport in 2016 amounted to 7.6 million tons, the capacity of Mariupol seaport reaches 18.8 million tons per year.

The port has the largest repair facility of its class on the Sea of Azov.

History

The birth of the port of Mariupol was a logical continuation of rapid development of the industrial Russian South in the second half of 19th century. The shallow wharf in the mouth of the Kalmius River did not meet the development requirements of the fleet along with those of the mining and metallurgical industry of Donets basin (Donbas).

In 1886 construction began for a deepwater port in Mariupol, near Zintseva balka (locality).

The construction was planned for five years, but was finished in three under pressure from industrialists.

On , 18 railcars carrying coal (about 2,000 poods) were brought on the port's embankment.

After a prayer in the presence of the Russian Minister of Railways and the Mariupol city governor Kharazhaev, there began the first loading onto a steamship of the Russian Society of Shipping and Trade "Medveditsa", which on  left for its destination.

This date is considered the start date of the port's operation. The port had huge significance for the development of industry in the region and the whole country. In the period 1867–1904, the Port of Mariupol was third in Russia among non-military ports by volume of assignments.

During the Russian Invasion of Ukraine , Russian forces took and occupied Mariupol.

On 26 May 2022, following closure during the Siege of Mariupol, Russia reopened the port to commercial vessels following naval mine removal.

Gallery

See also
List of ports in Ukraine
Transport in Ukraine

References

External links
 Port of Mariupol Authority
 Official website of State Stevedore Port Operator
 Port of Mariupol at the Ministry of Infrastructure

Port
Port
Ports and harbours of Ukraine
1889 establishments in Ukraine
Ports and harbours of the Sea of Azov
Ukrainian brands
Water transport in Ukraine
Ukrainian Sea Ports Authority